Lagbere  is a village in the commune of Bassila in the Donga Department of western Benin. It is located off the RNIE 3 highway.

External links
Satellite map at Maplandia

Populated places in the Donga Department
Commune of Bassila